Fauna of Slovenia includes:
 List of birds of Slovenia
 List of Lepidoptera of Slovenia
 List of mammals of Slovenia
 List of Odonata species of Slovenia

See also 
 Outline of Slovenia
 :Category:Fauna of Slovenia